Emily Jane Harding Andrews (1850–1940) was a British artist, illustrator and suffragette. She was a member of the Artists' Suffrage League.

Early life
Harding was born in 1850 in Bristol, England. She studied at Clifton Ladies' College and the Bristol School of Art.

Career 
In her early career she specialized in miniatures. One was included at the Royal Academy exhibition in 1877. By the mid-1880s, Harding had changed her focus to illustration, often of children's books, including Hand in Hand in Children's Land (1887) by S. and E. Lecky, The Little Ladies (1890) by Helen Milman, Merry Moments (1892) by Rose E. May, and The Disagreeable Duke (1894) by Eleanor Davenport Adams. She generally used her maiden name, though exceptions exist. Her translation and illustrations for "Fairy Tales of the Slav Peasants and Herdsmen" remain in print. 

Harding became involved with the Artists' Suffrage League, designing posters for the cause. She co-signed a letter to the editor of The Guardian in 1908, decrying the use of physical violence against activists, alongside fellow artist and suffragist Mary Sargant Florence.

Personal life 
In 1879 she married fellow artist Edward William Andrews. Harding's husband died in 1915, and she eventually emigrated to Australia. She died in 1940 in Sutherland Shire.

Gallery

References

External links

Images of Harding's art on ArtNet
Images of Harding's art on MutualArt

1850 births 
1940 deaths
19th-century British women artists
Artists from Bristol
British women's rights activists
English emigrants to Australia
English suffragettes
British women illustrators